Vorozheikin or Vorozheykin (feminine: Vorozheykina) is a Russian-language surname derived from the word vorozheyka, vorozheya, meaning  female fortune teller  or medicine woman.

The surname may refer to:

Grigory Vorozheykin (1895-1974), Soviet Marshal of Aviation 
Arseniy Vorozheykin(1912-2001) Soviet aviation commander, twice Hero of the Soviet Union

References

Russian-language surnames